Rohit Jugraj Chauhan is an Indian writer and director in the Punjabi cinema and Bollywood film industry. He has written screenplay for films like Players. He was assistant director to Sanjay Leela Bhansali and Ram Gopal Varma.

Personal life 
He met Viveka Babajee while he was directing his first film, James. They were in a serious relationship for two years and they broke up in 2007.

Filmography

References

External links

Living people
Indian male screenwriters
Year of birth missing (living people)
Hindi-language film directors
Place of birth missing (living people)
Punjabi-language film directors